James Patrick Dunne (16 March 1935 – 1983 or 1984) was an Irish footballer.

The son of Irish international Jimmy Dunne, Jimmy Dunne the younger played for St Patrick's Athletic with his brother Tommy, winning the 1959 FAI Cup. He also had brief stints in England, with Leicester City and Peterborough United. After leaving Leicester City he had a short spell with Tunbridge Wells United and on leaving Peterborough United he moved to Bedford Town and then Cambridge United

A former schoolboy international he made a scoring League of Ireland debut on 22 April 1956 against Shamrock Rovers in a Top Four Cup semi final tie.

Notes

References 

1935 births
1980s deaths
Republic of Ireland association footballers
Association footballers from Dublin (city)
Leicester City F.C. players
Peterborough United F.C. players
St Patrick's Athletic F.C. players
League of Ireland players
Tunbridge Wells F.C. players
Bedford Town F.C. players
Dunstable Town F.C. players
Association football forwards